Foot in Mouth may refer to:

 Foot-and-mouth disease
 Foot in Mouth Award, an award by the British Plain English Campaign for "a baffling comment by a public figure"
 Foot in Mouth (Goldfinger album), 2001
 Foot in Mouth (Green Day album), 1996